The J. Pius Callaghan Cup is a trophy that was formerly given to the ice hockey Junior A Champion of Atlantic Canada from 1981 until 1991.  The trophy is named for Joseph Pius Callaghan, sports writer for the Charlottetown Guardian, school teacher, and sports executive, by Hockey PEI.  From 1991 until 2006, the trophy was awarded to the playoff champion of the Maritime Junior A Hockey League.  In 2006 it was retired and now resides in the Charlottetown Civic Centre.  Prior to 1981, the championship was just called the Atlantic Junior A Championship.

History
First awarded in 1981, the Callaghan Cup was awarded to the top team to play in Nova Scotia, New Brunswick, Prince Edward Island, or Newfoundland and Labrador.  Prior to this, the championship was just known as the Atlantic Junior A Championship.

Depending on the year, the Callaghan Cup was the quarter-final of the Manitoba Centennial Cup National Championship and the winner would play the Central Champions for the Dudley Hewitt Cup Eastern Canada Championship.  Eventually, as Maritime hockey became less prominent, the Dudley Hewitt Cup went to the Central Champion only.

By 1991, all Maritime leagues had amalgamated into the Maritime Junior A Hockey League and the St. John's Junior Hockey League dropped down to Jr. B play.  The Canadian Amateur Hockey Association gave the MJAHL custody over the Callaghan Cup as its playoff championship.

In 2006, the Maritime Junior A Hockey League retired the trophy and replaced it with the Kent Cup.

Prior to the MJAHL taking control of the trophy, the Callaghan Cup/Atlantic Championship was won by a Prince Edward Island team 9 times, a Nova Scotia team 8 times, New Brunswick 3 times, and Newfoundland and Labrador once.

Since 1995, the Atlantic Region, Ottawa District of Ontario and the Quebec champions all compete together for a spot at the Royal Bank Cup through the Fred Page Cup.

Leagues in competition
Eastern Junior A Hockey League
Island Junior Hockey League
Maritime Junior A Hockey League (1968–1971)
Metro Valley Junior Hockey League
New Brunswick Junior Hockey League
Newfoundland Junior A Hockey League
St. John's Junior Hockey League

Champions

References

External links
Fred Page Cup Website
MJAHL Website
CJAHL Website

Ice hockey tournaments in Canada
Canadian ice hockey trophies and awards
Maritime Junior Hockey League
Atlantic Canada awards